Chyoda is a rural locality (a village) in Verkhnetoyemsky District, Arkhangelsk Oblast, Russia. The population was 405 as of 2010.

Geography 
Chyoda is located on the Yorga River, 25 km southeast of Verkhnyaya Toyma (the district's administrative centre) by road. Zagorye is the nearest rural locality.

References 

Rural localities in Verkhnetoyemsky District